Saccoderma is a genus of characins found in Colombia and Venezuela.  The three currently described species in this genus are:
 Saccoderma hastata (C. H. Eigenmann, 1913)
 Saccoderma melanostigma L. P. Schultz, 1944
 Saccoderma robusta Dahl, 1955

References
 

Characidae
Fish of South America